Dušan Bařica (born August 26, 1975) is a Czech former professional ice hockey forward.

Though he spent the majority of his career in the 1st Czech Republic Hockey League, Bařica managed to play eleven games in the Czech Extraliga, nine for HC Havířov and two for HC Zlín. He also played seven games in the Tipsport Liga for MHC Martin and 24 games in the French Super 16, eight for Brest Albatros Hockey and sixteen for Ducs de Dijon.

References

External links

1975 births
Living people
Brest Albatros Hockey players
Czech ice hockey forwards
Ducs de Dijon players
HC Havířov players
Hokej Šumperk 2003 players
LHK Jestřábi Prostějov players
HC Kometa Brno players
Sportspeople from Zlín
MHC Martin players
PSG Berani Zlín players
Czech expatriate ice hockey players in the United States
Czech expatriate ice hockey players in Slovakia
Czech expatriate sportspeople in France
Expatriate ice hockey players in France